Aaron Altaras (born 21 November 1995) is a German actor.

Altaras was born in Berlin, the son of Adriana Altaras and Wolfgang Böhmer. Altaras' mother, a Croatian Jew, was forced to escape Croatia with her parents, Jakob and Thea Altaras, because his grandfather had been politically persecuted by the League of Communists of Croatia. His mother is an actress, theater director, and writer, and his father is a composer. He has a younger brother, Leonard.

Altaras attended the Heinz Galinski elementary school in Berlin. During his education at Heinz-Galinski he was discovered by a casting team for the movie Mogelpackung Mann. In 2006 he began attending the gymnasium Jüdische Oberschule Berlin (Berlin Jewish High School). Altaras achieved nationwide attention with the lead role in the ARD TV movie  based on the childhood and youth memories of Michael Degen, German actor and writer who survived the Nazi regime as a Jewish boy in Germany.

Filmography
 2004: Mogelpackung Mann
 2005: Wenn der Vater mit dem Sohne
 2006:  
 2006: Allein unter Bauern
 2008: Höllenritt
 2008: Tatort: Tod einer Heuschrecke
 2010: Tatort: Hitchcock und Frau Wernicke
 2010: Die Kinder von Blankenese
 2015: Connect
 2017: The Invisibles
 2018: Mario
 2020: Unorthodox
 2022:

References

External links

1995 births
Living people
Altaras family
Male actors from Berlin
German people of Croatian-Jewish descent
Jewish German male actors
German male film actors
German male television actors
21st-century German male actors